Mohd Rafizi bin Ramli (born 14 September 1977) is a Malaysian politician who has served as the Minister of Economy in the Pakatan Harapan (PH) administration under Prime Minister Anwar Ibrahim since December 2022 and the Member of Parliament (MP) for Pandan from May 2013 to May 2018 and again since November 2022. He is a member of the People's Justice Party (PKR), a component party of presently the PH and formerly the Pakatan Rakyat (PR) coalitions. He has also served as the 5th Deputy President of PKR since July 2022. He served as Vice-President of PKR from August 2014 to July 2022,  Secretary-General of PKR from October 2014 to November 2016 and Strategic Director of PKR from December 2010 to October 2014. He is the founder of both the whistleblower organisation, National Oversight and Whistleblowers Centre (NOW) and the election volunteerism organisation, Invoke Malaysia (INVOKE).

Early life and education
Rafizi was born in Besut, Terengganu and was raised in Kemaman, an east-coast town. He came from a humble background; his father was a rubber tapper. During his schooling days he was active in extra-curricular activities where he represented Malay College Kuala Kangsar (MCKK) for debate championships as well as being a top student. After finishing his secondary education, he was awarded a scholarship to study Electrical Engineering at University of Leeds.

Rafizi has been active in politics since his university days. When Anwar Ibrahim was sacked as the deputy prime minister of Malaysia in 1998 he became more involved politics and had joined in the Reformasi movement. He dedicates his involvement in politics to Adlan, his close friend who had become his inspiration.

Early career

After graduating from college, Rafizi worked for an accounting firm in the United Kingdom and at, the same time, studied for professional papers and qualified as a chartered accountant under Institute of Chartered Accountants in England and Wales (ICAEW). Upon returning to Malaysia in 2003, Rafizi worked for the Malaysian oil company, Petronas from 2003 to 2009. During his tenure at Petronas, he held many important portfolios including managing Petronas' petrochemical assets. In 2009, he became the general manager of the health care company Pharmaniaga, before being appointed as the Chief Executive of the Selangor Economic Advisory Office, a position he held until July 2012.

Political career
Rafizi was elected to Parliament in the 2013 general election. PKR selected him to contest the seat of Pandan, which was held by former Malaysian Chinese Association (MCA) president Ong Tee Keat. Ong was dropped for the election by Barisan Nasional, though he remained popular among voters. The decision to do so was exploited by Rafizi, who repeatedly praised Ong on the campaign trail. Rafizi won the seat by a margin of 26,729 votes, more than twice the number received by the MCA candidate.

Rafizi did not contest the 2018 general election as his eligibility to stand as a candidate was put in doubt due to his pending appeal against a 30-month jail sentence for leaking banking details belonging to the National Feedlot Corporation (NFC) and its chairman.  The Pandan seat was instead contested and won by then-President of PKR Wan Azizah Wan Ismail.

Kajang Move
Rafizi is a close ally of the PKR's parliamentary leader Anwar Ibrahim. In 2014, Rafizi engineered the failed Kajang Move, which sought to oust Khalid Ibrahim, a PKR member, as Chief Minister of Selangor and install Anwar as his replacement. The move encountered a number of obstacles; it ultimately succeeded in forcing Khalid's resignation, but Azmin Ali, PKR's deputy president, replaced him instead.

In October 2014, after the Kajang Move reached its conclusion, Rafizi was appointed as secretary-general of PKR, replacing Saifuddin Nasution Ismail as the leading administrative officer of the party. Rafizi's appointment came two months after his election as one of the party's four vice-presidents. The party's constitution permitted him to hold both his appointed and elected positions.

Opposition
Rafizi Ramli has been a staunch critic of the Barisan Nasional (BN) led government. He has revealed many leakages in the government, including corruption and mismanagement. Among his infamous revelation for BN wrong doings was the National Feedlot Corporation (NFC) scandal which involved the Women, Family and Community Development Minister, Shahrizat Abdul Jalil. Shahrizat and her family were accused of misusing RM250 million in public funds meant for a state cattle ranch in Gemas, Negeri Sembilan.  She's, however, were cleared out from this case by Malaysian Anti-Corruption Commission (MACC). He has also revealed malpractices and wastages in the government which includes awarding of over-priced closed tender projects and purchasing of overpriced assets. Pakatan Rakyat state government officials also have their part with the revelation of 14th Menteri Besar of Selangor, Tan Sri Abdul Khalid Ibrahim out of court settlement with   Bank Islam over the RM66.67mil Kumpulan Guthrie Bhd shares when Khalid was the group’s chief executive officer. His revelation, which liquified Khalid Ibrahim's integrity were a part which culminated the Kajang Move.

Rafizi Ramli is an advocate for lower petrol prices. He criticised the government's move in 2014 to end petrol subsidies, arguing that it would benefit oil companies and petrol station owners but not the Malaysian people. He had prominently threaten to lead a street protest on 2015 New Year's Eve if the government did not lower the oil prices, following the fall of oil prices worldwide. He had also advocated for changes to the way petrol prices are fixed by the government, to protect petrol station owners from the deleterious impacts of fluctuating prices. His action for defending petrol station owners have attracted criticism from netizens and Utusan Malaysia for abandoning people's interest.

Rafizi was not able to run for reelection in 2018 because he was appealing a 30-month jail sentence from the Shah Alam sessions court for leaking banking details about the National Feedlot Corp and its chairman Salleh Ismail.

Return to active politics
On 15 March 2022, he announced his return to active politics, as well as his intention to run in the 2022 PKR party elections from April to July 2022 for the PKR deputy presidency, which was left vacant after Mohamed Azmin Ali left the party in February 2020. He noted that the future of progressive, multiracial politics would be in danger if PKR and PH carry on to be only the “third power” which fails to attract undecided voters. His supporters were demanding for him to return to active politics, and he was quoted as saying that he was considering several factors before making a decision. However, PKR leaders appeared divided about his return, with some, such as Selangor PKR deputy communications director Zainol Abidin Mohamed, criticising his decision to leave politics. Others, such as Kota Anggerik assemblyman Najwan Halimi, said he would welcome his return because he would be able to help strengthen the party. He was an opponent of Azmin in the last party elections in November 2018 for the PKR deputy president position and was defeated by Azmin.

At night of 29 May 2022, Saifuddin conceded defeat and congratulated Rafizi on his landslide victory against him in the contest for PKR deputy presidency in the elections although the results were still unofficial. He was the Deputy President-elect of PKR following his pending victory in the 2022 PKR leadership election. He was set to officially assume the position on the final day of the PKR National Congress on 17 July 2022. He did so after being officially named as PKR deputy president and official results being announced by the PKR election committee (JPP).

Controversies

Lawsuits
He was charged for exposing confidential Public Bank's customer document in his pursuit of exposing the NFC scandal. Rafizi was charged in August 2012 under Banking and Financial Institutions Act (Bafia) 1989 for revealing four Public Bank customer-profile documents on the balance summaries of the NFC, National Meat and Livestock Sdn Bhd, Agroscience Industries Sdn Bhd and NFC chairman, Datuk Seri Mohamad Salleh Ismail.

Rafizi was allegedly disclosed the documents to media consultant Yusuf Abdul Alim and to The Star reporter Erle Martin Carvalho, at the PKR headquarters in Petaling Jaya on 7 March 2012. Bank clerk Johari Mohamad, 44, is also accused of conspiring with Rafizi. His effort to strike out the charges were rejected by High Court on 23 November 2012, by Appeals Court on 23 May 2013 and finally, by Federal Court on 6 April 2015. His trial will begin 27 April 2015. On 7 February 2018 Rafizi was sentenced by a Sessions Court in Shah Alam to 30 months in jail for exposing confidential banking details relating to the NFC scandal. The conviction was however overturned by the High Court on 15 November 2019 and he was fully discharged from the earlier jail sentence.

On 8 April 2016, Rafizi pleaded not guilty to the charge of publishing libellous statement against Tabung Haji (TH) through the posting of an article with the heading '’Analisa Kewangan Tabung Haji 2009-2015” in his blog www.rafiziramli.com. On 27 February 2019 the Kuala Luampur Magistrate’s Court acquitted and discharged him on defaming TH.

In August 2017, a Malaysian High Court in Kuala Lumpur upheld an 18-month jail sentence against him for having page 98 of the 1MDB audit report without approval, in violation of the Official Secrets Act 1972. The conviction and 18-month jail sentence had prevented Rafizi from contesting in the GE14.
On 1 June 2018 after the GE14, Rafizi however was released on good behaviour bond of RM10,000 bound over for two years in one surety over the OSA conviction by the Court of Appeal.

On 16 November 2019, Rafizi Ramli succeeded in his appeal in the case involving NFC, National Meat and Livestock Sdn Bhd, Agroscience Industries Sdn Bhd and NFC chairman, Datuk Seri Mohamad Salleh Ismail. Judge involved in this appeal was Judge Mohd Yazid Mustafa. Mohd Yazid, in his ruling, said exhibit P4 and attachments A to D were photostated documents that failed to meet requirements under Section 65(1)(c) of the Evidence Act 1950, and therefore inadmissible. Also discharged and acquitted from the same charge was bank clerk Johari Mohamad.

Election results

References

1977 births
Living people
People from Terengganu
Malaysian people of Malay descent
Malaysian Muslims
Malaysian activists
Malaysian accountants
Malaysian politicians convicted of crimes
People's Justice Party (Malaysia) politicians
Members of the Dewan Rakyat
Alumni of the University of Leeds
Whistleblowing in Malaysia
21st-century Malaysian politicians